Urban Mass Transportation Act may refer to:

 Urban Mass Transportation Act of 1964
 Urban Mass Transportation Act of 1970

Now it is called Federal Transit Act